Grant Gordon Smith (born 5 May 1980) is a Scottish former professional footballer who played as a midfielder. He is the son of former Rangers and Brighton & Hove Albion striker and former Scottish Football Association chief executive Gordon Smith.

Playing career
Smith was born in Irvine. He signed a short-term contract with Dundee United in September 2006, agreeing to stay until the next transfer window in January 2007. Smith also played for English sides Bristol City and Walsall (on loan).

Smith then signed one-year contract with Finnish club HJK Helsinki in April 2007. 

Smith returned to Britain in January 2008 and joined Carlisle United on a short-term contract until the end of the season, after training with the club's squad. On 8 April 2009, he was released from Carlisle United by mutual consent after not making a single first team appearance under new boss Greg Abbott who later denied any fall-out with Smith even though impressing in reserve games out of position. 

He went to Singapore for trials with some of the local S-League teams for the 2010 season. He was brought to Singapore by the Football Association of Singapore (FAS) as part of their centralised scouting system of foreign players for S-League clubs

On 18 December 2009, he signed a short-term injury replacement deal with North Queensland Fury in the A-League linking up with Fury manager Ian Ferguson and Liverpool legend Robbie Fowler.

In February 2010, Smith returned to Scotland to sign for Ross County.

After joining Scottish 2nd Division club Airdrie United in January 2011, he was released by them a few months later in May.

Post playing career
Smith became an agent after retiring from playing, representing players such as Nathan Patterson and Barrie McKay.

See also
 2006–07 Dundee United F.C. season

References

External links
 CUFC official website profile
 

1980 births
Living people
Footballers from Irvine, North Ayrshire
Scottish footballers
Association football midfielders
Reading F.C. players
Heart of Midlothian F.C. players
Livingston F.C. players
Clydebank F.C. (1965) players
Sheffield United F.C. players
Halifax Town A.F.C. players
Plymouth Argyle F.C. players
Swindon Town F.C. players
Bristol City F.C. players
Walsall F.C. players
Dundee United F.C. players
Helsingin Jalkapalloklubi players
Carlisle United F.C. players
Ross County F.C. players
Airdrieonians F.C. players
Scottish Football League players
Scottish Premier League players
English Football League players
Veikkausliiga players
Scottish expatriate footballers
Expatriate footballers in Finland
Scottish expatriate sportspeople in Australia
A-League Men players
Northern Fury FC players
Klubi 04 players
Scottish expatriate sportspeople in Finland